Marta Linares may refer to:

 Marta Linares de Martinelli (born 1956), First Lady of Panama
 Marta Linares (gymnast) (born 1986), Spanish rhythmic gymnast